Seven Year Switch is an Australian reality-television series based on the 2015–2018 American series of the same name. The series aired on the Seven Network, starting on 15 March 2016. The show features four married couples whose relationships are in turmoil. The married people are matched with a person from one of the other couples and are to live together for 14 days, during which time there are no rules. At the end of the 14 days each of the couples reunite and make the decision to either part ways or reaffirm their commitment.

The series was renewed in August 2016, with the second season debuting on 17 April 2017.

In 2019 the Seven Network announced a reboot of the series called The Super Switch.

Season 1 (2016)

Couples

Brad & Tallena

This Brisbane couple Brad and Tallena met on Tinder. They were supposed to get married in February but postponed it because of time, stress and money, and now the wedding’s back on but they need to make things right before the big day. After the show the couple married and then divorced.

Tim & Jackie

These Brisbane fitness trainers met at the gym. They hooked up at work one night over a few drinks and their relationship started from there, but it seems that’s where the intimacy in their relationship began and ended. Their lack of any kind of romance is the number one issue for Jackie, followed by the resentment that’s building from running their fitness business from their home. After the show Jackie got pregnant with their son and the couple remain together as of October 2018. They have since welcomed a baby girl as well.

Ryan & Cassie

Cassie has 2 daughters: 11-month-old Emmerson with Ryan and nine-year-old Ramani from a previous relationship, though her biggest child is Ryan himself. Cassie is sick of dealing with a man-child. Cassie wants to reignite the passion she once had with Ryan. Ryan and Cassie had another baby girl, Mena, on 14 June 2016. After the show the couple remained together until mid-2017, when they separated.

Jason & Michelle

This Gold Coast couple has been together for seven years and have a four-year-old son and an eight-month-old daughter together. While Michelle is focused on being a good mum, Jason spends all his time establishing his motorbike business during the day and doing web design at night to make extra cash for his family, but Michelle wants more affection from Jason. The couple announced they had split in the reunion episode.

Ratings

Season 2 (2017)
A second season was announced in August 2016, and premiered on 17 April 2017.

Couples

Ratings

Other versions
 American version by Kinetic Content in 2015 for FYI, moved to Lifetime for Season 3
 British version by 7 Wonder Productions in 2018 for Channel 4

The Super Switch
The Super Switch is a spin-off series which aired on the Seven Network in 2019. The series premiered on 11 June June 2019 on Channel 7 and 7plus.

The series format was slightly changed: six couples still swapped partners, however three of each swapped couple were divided into two separate mansions.

Couples

References

External links
 Seven Year Switch on 7plus
The Super Switch on 7plus
The Super Switch Official Website
 Seven Year Switch - FYI IMDb
 Seven Year Switch USA channel 4
 Seven Year Switch Australia channel 4
 Seven Year Switch - Seven Network IMDb

2010s Australian reality television series
2016 Australian television series debuts
Seven Network original programming
Australian dating and relationship reality television series
English-language television shows
Australian television series revived after cancellation